This article lists events from the year 2018 in Malawi.

Incumbents
 President: Peter Mutharika 
 Vice-President: Saulos Chilima

Events

Deaths
15 February – Samuel Mpasu, writer, politician and diplomat (b. 1945)
17 February – Emmanuele Kanyama, Roman Catholic bishop (d. 1962)
19 February – Necton Mhura, academic, politician and diplomat (b. 1957).
6 May – Jack Chamangwana, football player and coach (b. 1957).
15 September – David Rubadiri, poet and diplomat (b. 1930).

References

 
2010s in Malawi
Years of the 21st century in Malawi
Malawi
Malawi